Bassem Nafti (born 21 August 1985) is a Tunisian football midfielder.

References

1985 births
Living people
Tunisian footballers
EGS Gafsa players
US Monastir (football) players
AS Gabès players
Association football midfielders
Tunisian Ligue Professionnelle 1 players